Mont-Saint-Michel is a municipality in the Laurentides region of Quebec, Canada, part of the Antoine-Labelle Regional County Municipality.

Geography
Its territory is characterized by a vast swamp and natural bog. Lake Gravel is one notable lake with vacation cottages surrounding it.

History
The place was originally called Saint-Michel-des-Cèdres, but it was renamed to avoid confusion with the similarly named Saint-Michel-des-Saints. In 1912, its post office opened, and in 1915, a parish was set up as a mission under the name Saint-Michel-Archange.

On September 11, 1928, the Municipality of Mont-Saint-Michel was created out of territory ceded from the United Township Municipality of Wurtele, Moreau et Gravel and Township of Décarie.

Demographics

Private dwellings occupied by usual residents (2021): 280 (total dwellings: 382)

Mother tongue:
 English as first language: 1%
 French as first language: 98%
 English and French as first language: 0%
 Other as first language: 0%

Local government

List of former mayors:
 Roger Lapointe (...–2013)
 André-Marcel Évéquoz (2013–present)

See also
List of municipalities in Quebec

References

External links
 

Incorporated places in Laurentides
Municipalities in Quebec